The 1694 Programme of 32-gun fifth rates were derived from the 1693 programme vessels as demi-batterie ships. The concept was to have one tier of ordnance flush on the upper deck for use in all weathers on a freeboard of at least seven feet. The ordnance would be arranged with a minimum of eleven gun ports on the upper deck. The lower deck would be provided with four to eight gun ports for heavier guns that could only be used in calm weather. For added propulsion ten oar ports per side would be provided with a central loading port. Nineteen more 32-gun vessels to these specifications were ordered in from 1694 to 1698 with Thirteen to be built by Contract and nine in dockyard.

Design and specifications
As with most vessels of this time period only order and launch dates are available. The dimensional data listed here is the specification data and the acceptable design creep will be listed on each individual vessel. The tonnage calculation would be  tons. The ships would be sail powered carrying a ship-rigged sail plan. Also there was a provision for ten oar ports per side located between the gun ports on the lower deck. Lyme and Scarborough would be rebuilt to the 1719 establishment for 20-gun vessels. The tonnage calculation would be 374{ tons (bm).

The gun armament initially was four demi-culverines mounted on wooden trucks on the lower deck (LD) with two pair of guns per side. The upper deck (UD) battery would consist of between twenty and twenty-two sakers guns mounted on wooden trucks with ten or eleven guns per side. The gun battery would be completed by four to six minions guns mounted on wooden trucks on the quarterdeck (QD) with two to three guns per side. In the 1703 Establishment the old gun designations would be replaced by a system that designated the guns by the weight of shot fired. The demi-culverines would become known as 9-pounders, the Sakers as 6-pounders and the minions as 4-pounders. Therefore, their armament as of 1703 for Shoreham and Sorlings would be listed as four 9-pounder guns on the lower deck (LD), twenty 6-pounder 19 hundredweight (cwt) guns on the upper deck (UD) with four 4-pounder 12 cwt guns on the quarterdeck (QD). For Scarborough, Faversham, Looe(ii)  and Bridgewater would be rerated as 36-gun vessels with an increase in the 9-pounders to eight guns. The 4-pounders would be removed in 1714. Under the 1719 Establishment the guns would be established as twenty 6-pounders on the upper deck (UD).

Ships of the 1694 Programme Group

Notes

Citations

References
 Winfield 2009, British Warships in the Age of Sail (1603 – 1714), by Rif Winfield, published by Seaforth Publishing, England © 2009, EPUB 
 Winfield 2007, British Warships in the Age of Sail (1714 – 1792), by Rif Winfield, published by Seaforth Publishing, England © 2007, EPUB 
 Colledge, Ships of the Royal Navy, by J.J. Colledge, revised and updated by Lt Cdr Ben Warlow and Steve Bush, published by Seaforth Publishing, Barnsley, Great Britain, © 2020, EPUB 
 Clowes (1898), The Royal Navy, A History from the Earliest Times to the Present (Vol. III). London. England: Sampson Low, Marston & Company, © 1898

 

Frigates of the Royal Navy
Ships of the Royal Navy